Gottfried Arn (24 November 1912 – 10 August 2006) was a Swiss wrestler. He competed in the men's freestyle lightweight at the 1936 Summer Olympics.

References

External links
 

1912 births
2006 deaths
Swiss male sport wrestlers
Olympic wrestlers of Switzerland
Wrestlers at the 1936 Summer Olympics
Place of birth missing